Piedrafita de Jaca is a locality located in the municipality of Biescas, in Huesca province, Aragon, Spain. As of 2020, it has a population of 42.

Geography 
Piedrafita de Jaca is located 74km north of Huesca.

References

Populated places in the Province of Huesca